Saint Louis University (SLU) is a private Jesuit research university with campuses in St. Louis, Missouri, United States, and Madrid, Spain. Founded in 1818 by Louis William Valentine DuBourg, it is the oldest university west of the Mississippi River and the second-oldest Jesuit university in the United States. The university is accredited by the Higher Learning Commission.

In the 2021–2022 academic year, SLU had an enrollment of 12,883 students. The student body included 8,138 undergraduate students and 4,745 graduate students that represents all 50 states and 82 countries.  The university is classified among "R2: Doctoral Universities – High research activity".

For more than 50 years, the university has maintained a campus in Madrid, Spain. The Madrid campus was the first freestanding campus operated by an American university in Europe and the first American institution to be recognized by Spain's higher education authority as an official foreign university. The campus has 850 students, a faculty of 110, an average class size of 17 and a student-faculty ratio of 12:1. Of the 12,883 students, 788 study at the Madrid Campus which also represents students from 45 of the 82 total countries students are from.

SLU's athletic teams compete in the National Collegiate Athletic Association's Division I and are a member of the Atlantic 10 Conference.

History

Early years
Saint Louis University traces its origins to the Saint Louis Academy, founded on November 16, 1818, by the Most Reverend Louis William Valentine DuBourg, Bishop of Louisiana and the Floridas, and placed under the charge of the Reverend François Niel and others of the secular clergy attached to the Saint Louis Cathedral. Its first location was in a private residence near the Mississippi River in an area now occupied by the Jefferson National Expansion Memorial within the Archdiocese of St. Louis. 

Already having a two-story building for the 65 students using Bishop Dubourg's personal library of 8,000 volumes for its printed materials, the name Saint Louis Academy was changed in 1820 to Saint Louis College (while the secondary school division remained Saint Louis Academy, now known as St. Louis University High School). In 1827 Bishop Dubourg placed Saint Louis College in the care of the Society of Jesus. Not long after that, it received its charter as a university by act of the Missouri Legislature.

University beginnings and American Civil War
In 1829, the new university moved its campus to Washington Avenue and Ninth, today the site of America's Center. At this time, the founders forced enslaved Black Americans from their St. Stanislaus Seminary in Hazelwood to labor at the university. In 1852 the university and its teaching priests were the subject of an anti-Catholic novel, The Mysteries of St. Louis, which was written by newspaper editor Henry Boernstein. Boernstein's popular newspaper, Anzeiger des Westens, routinely criticized the university.

In 1867, after the American Civil War, the university purchased "Lindell's Grove", in what is now Midtown. The university subsequently moved to this new location, which is the current site of today's north campus. Lindell's Grove was the site of the Camp Jackson Affair, which had occurred only a few years prior to the university's purchase.

The first building on campus, DuBourg Hall, began construction in 1888, and the college officially moved to its new location in 1889.  Construction of the new St. Francis Xavier College Church began on 8 June 1884. The basement of the church was completed later that year and was the location for liturgical functions until the upper church was subsequently completed in 1898.

20th century and shift to majority lay board of trustees

During the early 1940s, many local priests, especially the Jesuits, began to challenge the segregationist policies at the city's Catholic colleges and parochial schools. After the Pittsburgh Courier, an African-American newspaper, ran a 1944 exposé on St. Louis Archbishop John J. Glennon's interference with the admittance of a black student at the local Webster College, Fr. Claude Heithaus, SJ, professor of Classical Archaeology at Saint Louis University, delivered an angry homily accusing his own institution of immoral behavior in its segregation policies. By summer of 1944, Saint Louis University had opened its doors to African-Americans, after its president, Father Patrick Holloran, secured Glennon's reluctant approval .

In 1967, Saint Louis University became one of the first Catholic universities to give laypeople more power over the affairs of the school. Board chairman Fr. Paul Reinert, SJ, stepped aside to be replaced by layman Daniel Schlafly, and the board shifted to an 18 to 10 majority of laypeople. This was largely because of Horace Mann vs. the Board of Public Works of Maryland, a landmark case heard by the Maryland Court of Appeals, which declared unconstitutional grants to "largely sectarian" colleges. The Second Vatican Council has also been mentioned as a major influence on this decision for its increased focus on the laity, as well as the decreased recruitment of nuns and priests since the council.

From 1985 to 1992 the chairman of the Board of Trustees was William H. T. Bush (younger brother of former president George H. W. Bush). The younger Bush also taught classes at the school.

Since the move to lay oversight, there has been some debate over how much influence the Roman Catholic Church should have on the affairs of the university. The decision by the university to sell its hospital to Tenet Healthcare in 1997 met much resistance by both local and national Church leaders, but went ahead as planned. In 2015, the Catholic SSM Health system assumed operation of Saint Louis University hospital. A $500 million rebuilding of the hospital and construction of a new ambulatory care center was completed in 2020.

Timeline of notable events
 
 1818 – First institution of higher learning west of the Mississippi River
 1832 – First graduate programs west of the Mississippi River
 1836 – First medical school west of the Mississippi River
 1843 – First in the West to open a school of law
 1906 – First forward pass in football history
 1908 – First women students admitted
 1910 – First business school west of the Mississippi River
 1925 – First department of geophysics in the Western Hemisphere
 1927 – First federally licensed school of aviation
 1929 – First woman PhD graduate, Mother Marie Kernaghan
 1944 – First university in Missouri to establish an official policy admitting African-American students, integrating its student body
 1949 – First co-ed classes, in the College of Arts and Sciences
 1956 – Marguerite Hall, first women's hall of residence, opens.
 1959 – First dual credit program west of the Mississippi, named the 1818 Project and now known as the 1818 Advanced College Credit Program
 1967 – First major Catholic university to give lay and clergy people combined legal responsibility for institutional policy on its board of trustees.
 1972 – First human heart transplant in Missouri
 2013 – First Doctor of Philosophy (Ph.D.) degree in aviation in the world awarded

Campus

This area is split between two locations along Grand Boulevard. The north campus (or Frost Campus), located just north of I-64, is the site of most undergraduate learning, and is also home to the university's residence halls. The south campus, located just south of Chouteau Avenue, is the site of the Saint Louis University Hospital, the Doisy Research Center, and some athletic facilities. Most health science instruction takes place on the south campus. The Saint Louis University School of Law is located in downtown St. Louis in Scott Hall.

Since 1967, the university has also maintained a campus in Madrid, Spain. Saint Louis University Madrid has over 900 students from more than 50 countries. Many undergraduates from the St. Louis campus who study abroad choose to take classes in Madrid, as the college credits are easily transferrable.

Clock tower
Built in 1993, Saint Louis University's clock tower closed off the campus from the remainder of West Pine Avenue. The surrounding plaza has become a center of campus life, host to social gatherings, protests, and philanthropic events.

In 2011, the clock tower and the area around it were renamed for a prominent alumnus as the Joseph G. Lipic Clock Tower Plaza. Additionally, on 25 October 2021, the amphitheater adjacent to the plaza was renamed in honor of Jonathan Smith, a former faculty member who had died earlier that year.

In October 2014, the clocktower plaza became the focal point for a student-led demonstration known as OccupySLU. Hundreds of students descended on the plaza to engage in teach-ins, peaceful protest, and conversation in the aftermath of the shooting of Michael Brown and the shooting of Vonderrit Myers Jr. Students and community leaders peacefully occupied the plaza for six days. During this time, newly-chosen university president Fred Pestello negotiated with demonstrators to end the occupation. These efforts culminated in the Clocktower Accords, in which Pestello promised to take concrete action to address the demands of demonstrators.

Major campus construction and renovation

Edward A. Doisy Research Center
In 2007, SLU completed a $67 million, 10-story research center connected to its Medical Campus Building, a green building named for Edward Adelbert Doisy, Nobel Prize in Physiology or Medicine laureate of 1943 and a long-time faculty member at SLU's medical school. The building contains 80 labs that are used in the development of vaccines and in research initiatives studying cancer, liver disease, and other health conditions. The building now mainly hosts the Edward A. Doisy Department of Biochemistry and Molecular Biology.

Saint Louis University School of Law

Saint Louis University School of Law, founded in 1843, is the oldest law school west of the Mississippi River. Law students attend classes in Scott Hall, which is in downtown St. Louis. Scott Hall was bought and renovated by the university between 2012 and 2013, as the law school had outgrown its former site on SLU's midtown campus. The newly renovated building opened in 2013.

Chaifetz Arena

The multi-purpose Chaifetz Arena, built for $80.5 million in 2008, is a 10,600-seat stadium located on-campus. The arena also contains training facilities, locker rooms, and a practice facility that can house 1,000 spectators. It is on the eastern end of the north campus. The arena replaced Enterprise Center as the university's primary location for large events, notably commencement celebrations and varsity sports. The arena is named for alumnus Richard Chaifetz, founder and CEO of ComPsych Corp., who gave $12 million to the university for the arena's naming rights. The Arena was named on February 28, 2007, and dedicated on April 10, 2008.

Interdisciplinary Science and Engineering Building
In the fall of 2020, the university opened a new, 90,000-square-foot, three-story building featuring "innovative teaching environments and flexible lab spaces." The building supplements bioinformatics, biology, biomedical engineering, chemistry, neuroscience and computer science courses that support all science, engineering, nursing and health science majors at SLU.

Housing
Saint Louis has residence halls and student apartment space on campus.

As part of the university's First Year Experience (FYE) program, students are required to live on campus for their first four semesters at SLU, unless they are a commuter from the St. Louis metropolitan area.

For the 2018–19 school year, the university installed 2,300 Echo Dots, the hardware for Amazon's "smart assistant," Alexa, in students' dorm rooms. SLU is the first college or university in the United States to bring an Amazon Alexa-enabled device into every student apartment or student residence hall room on the campus.

Residence halls
The Griesedieck Complex (also known as "Gries", pronounced "greez") has 16 stories of living space in its main building, as well as 9 additional floors of space attached on its west and east sides as Clemens Hall and Walsh Hall, respectively. Both halls were renovated and repainted (Walsh in 2019 and Clemens in 2020) to accommodate future larger freshman classes, and to house sophomores as needed.

Spring Hall and Grand Hall, built in 2016 and 2017 respectively, added nearly 1,000 beds for first and second-year students in addition to a dining hall, more classrooms, and further office space for administrators.

DeMattias Hall (colloquially known as "DeMatt"), located just east of Vandeventer Boulevard, provides themed housing to students participating in Greek Life. Next door to DeMattias is Marguerite Hall (also known as "Marg"), with seven floors of double suite-style rooms mainly for first-year students and sophomores.

On-campus apartments

Grand Forest, the Village, and the Marchetti Towers are on-campus apartment options available to sophomores, juniors, and seniors. Grand Forest and Marchetti Towers are located east of Grand Boulevard and just west of Chaifetz Arena.

The Village apartments are located between Vandeventer Boulevard and Grand Boulevard. The complex houses up to 480 students at a time. Apartments in the Village come in one, two, three and four-bedroom layouts.

St. Francis Xavier College Church

Located at the corner of Grand Boulevard and Lindell Avenue is the university's official parish, St. Francis Xavier College Church. Built between 1888 and 1894 by architect Thomas Walsh, who also designed DuBourg Hall, the church was the first English-speaking parish in the city of St. Louis. The church has held a weekly Sunday Evening Student Mass for SLU students since 1990.

Libraries and museums

Saint Louis University has three libraries in St. Louis, and one on its campus in Madrid, Spain: the Pius XII Memorial Library on the north campus, the Medical Center Library on south campus, the Vincent C. Immel Library at the law school in downtown St. Louis, and the library in San Ignacio Hall in Madrid.

Pius XII Memorial Library is the general academic library. It houses over 2.2 million books and e-books, and has 48 study rooms for students to use. Recent renovations to the library include more seating and study areas, designated noise zones and the creation of an Academic Technology Commons on the first floor. Housed within Pius XII Memorial Library is the Knights of Columbus Vatican Film Library, which holds a unique collection of microfilm focusing on the manuscripts housed in the Biblioteca Apostolica Vaticana.

In 1964, SLU president Rev. Paul Reinert established the Saint Louis University Library Associates. The Associates are a group of "civic-minded St. Louisans...dedicated to the growth of the university libraries." Since 1967, the organization has presented the St. Louis Literary Award to a distinguished figure in literature. Notable recipients of the award include Sir Salman Rushdie, E.L. Doctorow, and Joan Didion.

The university also has three museums: the Museum of Contemporary Religious Art (MOCRA), the Saint Louis University Museum of Art (SLUMA), and the Samuel Cupples House.

Academics and rankings

SLU offers 89 undergraduate majors and 86 graduate disciplines. Additionally, 13 undergraduate and 21 graduate degree programs are also offered entirely online. The average class size for undergraduates is 26 and the student-faculty ratio is 9:1.

The university operates 13 schools and colleges: the College of Arts and Sciences, the College of Philosophy and Letters, the Doisy College of Health Sciences, the School of Medicine, the Trudy Busch Valentine School of Nursing, the College for Public Health and Social Justice, the School of Social Work, the Richard A. Chaifetz School of Business, the School of Education, the School of Law, the Parks College of Engineering, Aviation and Technology, the School for Professional Studies, and Saint Louis University Madrid. In addition, the university also operates the degree-granting Center for Advanced Dental Education.

Athletics

The Saint Louis Billikens are the collegiate athletic varsity teams of Saint Louis University. This NCAA Division I program fields teams in men's soccer, women's soccer, men's basketball, women's basketball, men's baseball, women's softball, women's volleyball, men's swimming and diving, women's swimming and diving, men's cross country, women's cross country, men's tennis, women's tennis, men's track and field, women's track and field, and women's field hockey. The university competes in the Atlantic 10 Conference.

In 2016, the women's basketball team made their second trip to the Women's National Invitation Tournament. Chris May is the current director of athletics. Travis Ford was hired as the men's basketball coach in March 2016.

Student life

Campus Ministry
The university's Campus Ministry presents a variety of activities and events, including opportunities to attend Holy Mass and numerous spiritual retreat opportunities. The ministry also hosts "immersion trips" that are aimed at exposing students to the social injustices and inequities present around the United States.

Immersion experiences involve a week-long trip, and reflection sessions after. Destinations for these trips include: Mobile, Alabama, Navajo Nation, Los Angeles, California, and Chicago, Illinois. Student leadership training is also offered in conjunction with these experiences.

Learning Communities
SLU has nine Learning Communities (LCs), which allow first-year and second-year students to live in the same residence hall and take classes that are centered around a particular major, aspect of social identity and experience, or academic interest. As of 2022, about half of all SLU first-years choose to participate in a Learning Community.

Center for Social Action
The Center for Social Action works with campus ministry and student organizations to promote community service. The center also works with university instructors to incorporate service into their curriculum wherever possible.

Students at SLU ranked 4th among the universities in the country in hours of community service in 2015, according to the Washington Monthly report. The center also partners with dozens of community organizations to provide students with consistent volunteer opportunities.

Student organizations
Saint Louis University has over 240 student organizations that cover a variety of interests, including: student government, club sports, media and publishing, performing arts, and religion and volunteerism and service.
 Alpha Epsilon Delta (ΑΕΔ) – Pre-health honor society hosting medically oriented speakers and providing information, guidance, and resources to pre-medical and other pre-health students.
 Alpha Kappa Psi (ΑΚΨ) – A co-educational professional business fraternity, it is the oldest and largest professional business fraternity to current date.
 Alpha Phi Omega (ΑΦΩ) – A co-educational service fraternity that promotes the values of leadership, friendship, and service.
 Campus Kitchen – Program where student volunteers cook safe, unused food from campus dining facilities and deliver meals to low-income individuals and local community organizations.
 Delta Sigma Pi (ΔΣΠ) – A co-ed professional business fraternity in the Richard A. Chaifetz School of Business that promotes the study of business, commerce, and economics.
 Global Brigades – International student led organization that focuses on holistic and sustainable development working with global communities in need. Saint Louis University sends groups to Nicaragua, Panama, and Honduras.
 KSLU – Student-run radio station, broadcasting 24/7.

 Parks Guard – Military drill team that competes in competitions and conducts honor guard ceremonies for local events.
 SLUnatics – Designated student fan club for university sports.
 The University News (or UNews) – Student-run news publication covering topics pertaining to the Saint Louis University community since 1921.

Greek life
Saint Louis has six North American Interfraternity Conference fraternities and seven National Panhellenic Conference sororities and female fraternities on campus.

Fraternities
 Alpha Delta Gamma
 Beta Theta Pi
 Alpha Iota Omicron
 Sigma Chi
 Sigma Tau Gamma
 Tau Kappa Epsilon

Sororities
 Alpha Delta Pi
 Delta Gamma
 Gamma Phi Beta
 Kappa Alpha Theta
 Kappa Delta
 Zeta Tau Alpha
 Phi Mu

Notable alumni, faculty, and school presidents

See also
 List of Jesuit sites

References

External links 

 
 Saint Louis Athletics website

 
Jesuit universities and colleges in the United States
Educational institutions established in 1818
Private universities and colleges in Missouri
Catholic universities and colleges in Missouri
Association of Catholic Colleges and Universities
Roman Catholic Archdiocese of St. Louis
1818 establishments in Missouri Territory
Midtown St. Louis
Universities and colleges accredited by the Higher Learning Commission